HC Slavia Sofia, Slaviya Sofiya) is an ice hockey team from the Bulgarian Hockey League based in Sofia, Bulgaria. The team has won 19 league titles, and are a member of the Slavia Sofia sports club.

History
The team was founded in 1919 under the name of NFD Slavia Sofia. They competed as DSO Stroitel Sofia from 1948–1951, and six years as Udarnik Sofia, before changing their name to Slavia Sofia in 1957. The team has won nineteen Bulgarian championships, making them the most successful team in the country. They have also finished as runners-up eleven times, and won the Bulgarian Cup twelve times. The club has participated in the IIHF Continental Cup several times, and have never made it past the second round.

Notable players
 Konstantin Mihailov
 Georgi Milanov
 Kiril Vajarov

External links
Official website 
Club profile on hockeyarenas.net

1919 establishments in Bulgaria
Bulgarian Hockey League teams
Ice hockey teams in Bulgaria
Ice hockey clubs established in 1919